Tomás Gustavo Andrade (born 16 November 1996) is an Argentine professional footballer who plays as an attacking midfielder for Chilean Primera División club Audax Italiano.

Career

Early career
Born in Temperley, Buenos Aires, Andrade started playing at age six for Club Parque. In 2004, he joined the youth ranks of Lanús. In 2007, he traveled to Spain and had trials at Atlético Madrid and FC Barcelona, but ultimately decided to return to Lanús where he signed his first contract. After leaving Lanús in late 2011, Andrade joined River Plate in 2012 and signed a contract with them in December of that year. In 2013, he was elected the best player of the La Comunidad de Madrid under-17 tournament won by River. Also in 2013, he received call-ups for the Argentina under-17 national team.

In September 2015, Andrade was loaned to newly promoted Premier League club Bournemouth and joined the club's under-21s squad.

River Plate
Andrade returned to River Plate in early 2016 and made his professional debut in 30 April of that year against Vélez Sarsfield in the Primera División. He appeared in both legs of the 2016 Recopa Sudamericana and was part of the winning campaigns of the 2015–16 and 2016–17 Copa Argentina.

Atlético Mineiro (loan)
On 24 January 2018, Andrade joined Brazilian club Atlético Mineiro on a year-long loan deal which included an optional buyout clause. He scored his first professional goal on 7 June 2018, in a 3–1 derby win over América.

Athletico Paranaense (loan)
After his time with Atlético Mineiro, Andrade joined Athletico Paranaense on 25 January 2019 on a one-year loan from River Plate.

Honours
River Plate
Copa Argentina: 2015–16, 2016–17
Recopa Sudamericana: 2016

Athletico Paranaense
J.League Cup / Copa Sudamericana Championship: 2019

References

External links

1996 births
Living people
Argentine footballers
Argentina youth international footballers
Association football midfielders
Argentine Primera División players
Club Atlético River Plate footballers
Campeonato Brasileiro Série A players
Clube Atlético Mineiro players
Club Athletico Paranaense players
Argentinos Juniors footballers
Sud América players
Argentine expatriate footballers
Argentine expatriate sportspeople in England
Argentine expatriate sportspeople in Brazil
Expatriate footballers in England
Expatriate footballers in Brazil
People from Lomas de Zamora Partido
Sportspeople from Buenos Aires Province